Stephen John Brown (born August 16, 1948) is a Canadian composer. He holds ARCT Diplomas in both Theory and Composition from the Royal Conservatory of Music and is an Associate of the Canadian Music Centre. Brown, composer-in-residence, at the Victoria Conservatory of Music, British Columbia, was the Composition and Theory Department Head, and an examination designer and syllabus design consultant for the Royal Conservatory of Music of Toronto. He served as a juror for the British Columbia Arts Council (performance & composition), and is a clinician and adjudicator in Western Canada.

References

External links
www.stephenbrown.ca Official website

1948 births
20th-century classical composers
21st-century classical composers
Canadian classical composers
People from Nottingham
Living people
The Royal Conservatory of Music alumni
Canadian male classical composers
20th-century Canadian composers
20th-century Canadian male musicians
21st-century Canadian male musicians